The 1902 Boston College football team was an American football team that represented Boston College as an independent during the 1902 college football season. Led by Arthur White in his first and only season as head coach, Boston College compiled a record of 0–8.

Schedule

References

Boston College
Boston College Eagles football seasons
College football winless seasons
Boston College football
1900s in Boston